Raajahyogam is a 2022 Indian Telugu-language action comedy film directed by Ram Ganapathi and produced under the banner of Sri Navabala Creations and Vaishnavi Nataraj Productions. The film stars Sai Ronak alongside Ankita Saha, Bismi Naas and Ajay Ghosh in pivotal roles. Film released on 30 December 2022.

Movie gets mixed to negative reviews from critics. Praise Sai Ronak presence, comedy, score but criticized on Screenplay, editing and runtime.

Plot
Rishi (Sai Ronak) from a middle-class family works as a mechanic but somehow falls in love with a rich girl and wants to settle down in life. In this sequence, he sees Sri (Ankita Saha) and falls in love at first sight. But she is in a relationship with a business magnate (Jeeva) who wants to live a life of luxury. What happened to Rishi after that? In the end, who did Rishi marry Aishwarya and Sri? That is the story of the rest of the movie

Cast
 Sai Ronak as Rishi
 Ankita Saha as Shree
 Bismi Naas as Aishwarya 
 Ajay Ghosh as Radha, Gangster
 Sijju Daniel as Daniel, Diamond smuggler
 Chitram Seenu as Radha's Assistant 
 Bhadram as Hotel Floor Manager 
 Thagubothu Ramesh as Trump
 Shakalaka Shankar as Jump
 Praveen as Karan
 Giridhar as Johar
 Madhunandan as Resort Manager
 Jeeva as Sugar Daddy 
 Ravi Prakash as Car owner 
 Jabardasth Chalaki Chanti as Mechanic, Rishi friend 
 Jabardasth Appa Rao as Garage Owner

Release
Movie theatrically released on 30 December 2022 in Telegu only.

From 9 February 2023 Film available on Disney+Hotstar in Telugu, Tamil, Kannada, Hindi and Malayalam with same title.

References

External links 

2022 films
2022 action comedy films
Indian action comedy films
Films shot in Hyderabad, India
Films about organised crime in India
Indian comedy films
Indian heist films
2020s masala films
2020s Telugu-language films